Ronald Bergan (né Ginsberg, 2 November 1937 – 23 July 2020) was a South African-born British writer and historian. He was contributor to The Guardian (from 1989) and lecturer on film and other subjects as well as the author (or co-author) of several books including biographies.

Career
He was born Ronald Ginsberg in Johannesburg and educated there, in England, and in the United States. In France, he taught literature, theater, and film at the Sorbonne, the British Institute in Paris, and the University of Lille. He held a Chair at the Florida International University in Miami where he taught Film History and Theory. He lectured on film history at FAMU in Prague.

He was a writer for The Guardian and Radio Times, journalist, biographer, film historian, International Festival of Independent Cinema Off Camera (the head of the Jury), Film Festival Juror, founding president of FEDEORA (Federation of Film Critics of Europe and the Mediterranean) in May 2010 in Cannes, and film critic.

Personal life
In 1960, Bergan married Maureen Myersohn, who later changed her name to Catriona. They lived primarily in London. They had a son, though they were impoverished at his birth and could not raise him, and so they arranged to have him adopted and raised by Myersohn's mother, who lived in Rhodesia, now Zimbabwe. The couple briefly separated in the early 1980s but reconciled. However, in the early 2000s, after Bergan's stint at Florida International University in the United States, they moved to Biarritz, France, and then Prague, Czechoslovakia.

In 2020, Bergan and his wife moved to Scotland. He died on 23 July 2020, aged 82, from urosepsis.

Bibliography 
 
 
 Ronald Bergan. Robyn Karney. Bloomsbury Foreign Film Guide (London: Bloomsbury, 1988, 1991),
 known, in the United States, as the Holt Foreign Film Guide, Henry Holt and Company, 1989
 then 
 
 
 
 
 
 
 
 
 
 
 The Eyewitness Guide To Film

References

External links 
 Ronald Bergan, Guardian articles

1937 births
2020 deaths
20th-century British journalists
20th-century British male writers
20th-century British writers
20th-century British non-fiction writers
21st-century British journalists
21st-century British male writers
21st-century British non-fiction writers
British expatriates in France
British expatriates in the Czech Republic
British expatriates in the United States
British film critics
British film historians
Deaths from sepsis
Florida International University faculty
Infectious disease deaths in Scotland
South African emigrants to the United Kingdom
The Guardian journalists
Writers from Johannesburg